Night Over Taos was a 1932 Broadway three-act drama written by Maxwell Anderson,
produced by the Group Theatre and staged by Lee Strasberg. It was the Group Theatre's
third production. It ran for 13 performances from March 9, 1936 closing that month at the 48th Street Theatre.

It was revived off Broadway in 2007, directed by Estelle Parsons.

Cast

 Luther Adler as Don Fernando	
 Stella Adler as Dona Josefa	
 Harry Bellaver as Diego
 Phoebe Brand as Nuna	
 J. Edward Bromberg as Pablo Montoya
 Morris Carnovsky as Father Martinez	
 William Challee as second trapper	
 Grover Burgess as	third trapper	
 Walter Coy as Felipe	
 Gerrit Kraber as Santos	
 Lewis Leverett as	Don Hermano	
 Robert Lewis as Indian slave	
 Sanford Meisner as Don Miguel	
 Mary Morris as Dona Vera	
 Ruth Nelson as Diana	
 Clifford Odets as	Mateo	
 Dorothy Patten as	Carlota	
 Art Smith as Captain Mumford	
 Eunice Stoddard as Lita	
 Franchot Tone as Federico	
 Margaret Barker as Raquel	
 Clement Wilenchick as	Andros
 Gertrude Maynard as Conchita
 Virginia Farmer as Valeria	
 Sylvia Feningston as Cristina	
 Friendly Ford as Graso	
 Paula Miller as Maria	
 Herbert Ratner as Narciso
 Philip Robinson as Don Mario

References

External links 
 
New York Times review of 2007 revival of Night Over Taos

1932 plays
Broadway plays
Plays by Maxwell Anderson
Plays set in New Mexico